The 1964–65 Liga Alef season saw Hapoel Mahane Yehuda (champions of the North Division) and Hapoel Be'er Sheva (champions of the South Division) win the title and promotion to Liga Leumit.

North Division

South Division

References
Maccabi Zikhron joins Hapoel Ra'anana, Beitar Harari and Hapoel Ramla to Liga Bet Davar, 13.6.65, Historical Jewish Press 
Full stop at the South Maariv, 20.6.65, Historical Jewish Press  
FA committee awarded 3-0 to Nazareth over Hapoel Hadera Maariv, 9.8.65, Historical Jewish Press 
Club HaBira (YMCA) Maariv, 25.10.64, Historical Jewish Press 
Previous seasons The Israel Football Association 

Liga Alef seasons
Israel
2